Albert Zahn was a self-taught sculptor from the Prussian province of Pomerania, who lived and worked in Door County, Wisconsin for most of his life. He is known primarily for his painted wood carvings of birds. Zahn is also well known for his depictions of angels and for the creation of the Albert Zahn House which he built with his wife Louise Zahn, and adorned with hundreds of his carvings. Albert Zahn carved most of his sculptures from cedar and then instructed Louise Zahn who painted them. Some of Zahn's other notable subjects include maritime workers, Prussian soldiers, dogs, and deer.

Life and work 
Born in 1864 in Pomerania (now part of Germany) Albert Zahn immigrated to the United States as a child, settling in Door County, Wisconsin where he worked as a farmer. Zahn began his career in the arts after retirement. He was raised Lutheran, and his piety informed most of his sculpture. His relatives have attested to Zahn's familiarity with the bible, and it is possible to trace significance of almost all of his subjects within Old Testament Psalms. Birds held particular significance as a subject for Zahn, earning him the nickname "Birdman of Baileys Harbor". In 1924 Albert and Louise Zahn built a house in Baileys Harbor, Wisconsin which he named Birds Park. Now also known as the Albert Zahn House, the property was added to the National Register of Historic Places in 2000. Zahn decorated the house and property extensively with his sculptures. Most of the pieces that decorated his home have now been dispersed into private collections. Zahn continued to build his large body of work until 1950 when his wife died. Albert Zahn died three years later in 1953. Inspired by his work, Albert Zahn's grandson and great grandson, Ed Zahn and Randy Zahn both became woodcarvers and often carved the same subjects as Albert Zahn.

Permanent collections 

 John Michael Kohler Arts Center, Sheboygan, Wisconsin 
 Smithsonian Institution, Washington, D.C.
 Milwaukee Art Museum, Milwaukee, Wisconsin
 Art Institute of Chicago, Chicago, Illinois
 Intuit, Chicago, Illinois
 Carl Hammer Gallery, Chicago, Illinois

References 

People from Pomerania
20th-century American sculptors
1864 births
1953 deaths
German emigrants to the United States
American male sculptors
20th-century American male artists
People from Baileys Harbor, Wisconsin
Sculptors from Wisconsin